Andrew John Corran (born 25 November 1936) is a former first-class English cricketer and schoolmaster.

After starting his career at Gresham's School, Holt (where he was also a good hockey player), at Trinity College, Oxford (where he was a cricket blue in all three of his seasons), and in Minor Counties cricket for Norfolk, Corran moved to Nottinghamshire, for whom he played between 1961 and 1965. He was the club's captain in the 1962 season, when he made 620 runs and took 64 wickets in the County Championship, but Nottinghamshire finished 15th. In the 1965 County Championship he took 109 wickets at an average of 20.30.

In the 1960 Oxford and Cambridge match, Corran took 12 wickets for 116 runs. Earlier in the season he had taken 7 for 45, bowling unchanged through the innings, to dismiss Lancashire for 103. Also in 1960, he played for the Gentlemen in the Gentlemen v Players match at Lord's.

A schoolmaster, Corran took a job in Australia in late 1965 and ended his first-class cricket career. From 1968 until his retirement he taught mathematics and cricket at Cranleigh School in Surrey.

He and his wife Gay, an artist, have five children.

References

External links
 

1936 births
Living people
English cricketers
Nottinghamshire cricketers
Nottinghamshire cricket captains
People educated at Gresham's School
Alumni of Trinity College, Oxford
Cricketers from Norwich
Oxford University cricketers
Gentlemen cricketers
Norfolk cricketers
Gentlemen of England cricketers
Schoolteachers from Norfolk